Danijela Ilić (Serbian Cyrillic: Данијела Илић, born August 20, 1970, in Niš, SFR Yugoslavia) is a former Yugoslavian and Serbian female basketball player.

Personal life 
Ilić has two sons, Luka (born 1999) and Ivan (born 2001), who are professional footballers. Both sons are playing for Red Star Belgrade, on loan from Manchester City.

External links
Profile at eurobasket.com

1970 births
Living people
Basketball players from Niš
Serbian women's basketball players
Yugoslav women's basketball players
Shooting guards